Tally Brown, New York  is a 1979 documentary film directed, written and produced by Rosa von Praunheim.

The film received international attention and was shown, for example, at the Museum of Modern Art in New York City in 1979.

Plot
The film follows the singing and acting career of Tally Brown, a classically trained opera and blues singer who became a star of the New York underground scene in the late 1960s. In this documentary, von Praunheim draws on extensive interviews with Brown, in which she shares her collaborations with Andy Warhol, Taylor Mead and other artists, and friendships with Ching Ho Cheng, Holly Woodlawn and Divine. Brown opens the film with a cover of David Bowie's Heroes and closes with Rock 'n' Roll Suicide. The film not only captures Tally Brown's career, but also a certain New York milieu of the 1970s.

Production notes
The documentary is also notable for being the first of Praunheim's many portraits of women, mostly aging legendary performers, who have become iconic figures in the LGBT community.

Awards
 1979: German Film Award (for best non-feature film)
 1979: Nominated for the Gold Hugo at the Chicago International Film Festival

Reception
The Village Voice wrote: "In its way, Tally Brown, New York is the best documentary about New York since Chantal Akerman's News From Home",  and "a must-see for all those interested in performance and the cultural history of New York in the ’70s."

Notes

External links

References 
Murray, Raymond. Images in the Dark: An Encyclopedia of Gay and Lesbian Film and Video Guide. TLA Publications, 1994, 

1979 films
West German films
1970s German-language films
1979 documentary films
German documentary films
Documentary films about New York City
Documentary films about actors
Documentary films about singers
Films directed by Rosa von Praunheim
Documentary films about LGBT topics
Historiography of LGBT in New York City
Documentary films about the cinema of the United States
1979 LGBT-related films
Documentary films about women in music
American documentary films
1970s English-language films
1970s American films
1970s German films